Maria Bamford (born September 3, 1970) is an American actress and stand-up comedian. Her work has drawn critical acclaim and controversy because her humor often uses self-deprecating and dark topics, including her dysfunctional family, depression, anxiety, suicide, and mental illness.

Her first comedy album and tour was The Burning Bridges Tour (2003), followed by eight more albums and specials. One of her first feature films is Lucky Numbers (2000), and she voiced characters on many animated shows, including Shriek on CatDog, and many more on American Dad!, Ugly Americans, Adventure Time, and BoJack Horseman. Her film work includes Stuart Little 2 (2002), Charlotte's Web 2: Wilbur's Great Adventure (2003), Barnyard (2006), Heckler (2007), and Hell and Back (2015). She voices Talking Ginger and Talking Becca in the Talking Tom and Friends web series. Her live television work began in Louie (2012), Arrested Development (2013–2019), WordGirl (2007–2015), Big Mouth (2017–present), and Human Resources (2022–present). In 2014, she won the American Comedy Award for Best Club Comic.

The 2016 Netflix original series Lady Dynamite, in which she plays the lead role, is based on her life. She voiced Tito, the Anxiety Mosquito, in Big Mouth.

Early life
Maria Bamford was born on September 3, 1970, at the Port Hueneme Naval Base in Port Hueneme, California. Her father, Joel Bamford, was serving as a Navy doctor. She grew up in Duluth, Minnesota, attending Chester Park Elementary and Duluth Marshall School. She has stated that when she was younger, she was often troubled with her anxiety, depression, and what she has called "Unwanted Thoughts Syndrome", a subset of obsessive–compulsive disorder.

Upon graduating high school, she attended Bates College in Lewiston, Maine. In 1992, she transferred to the University of Edinburgh in Scotland at the start of her junior year. She became the first female member of the college's improvised comedy group, The Improverts. After a year in Scotland, she transferred back to her home state and enrolled at the University of Minnesota, where she earned a Bachelor of Arts degree in English. She began stand-up comedy in Minneapolis, Minnesota at age 19, at Stevie Ray's Comedy Cabaret.

Career

Comedy beginnings: 1998–2008 
Bamford has been in many movies and television shows, including cartoon voices. She was the voice of Shriek DuBois in Nickelodeon's CatDog, a wide selection of secondary characters in Cartoon Network's Adventure Time, and Mrs. Botsford, Violet, and Leslie on the long running PBS educational series WordGirl. She does impersonations, including her mother and her agent. Her stand-up comedy often takes the form of vignettes rather than the standard setup-and-punchline format.

Bamford was featured in the documentary series The Comedians of Comedy on Comedy Central and Showtime, and appears in short skits titled The Maria Bamford Show, broadcast on the website Super Deluxe. She appears on the comedy compilation CD Comedy Death-Ray.

Rise to prominence: 2008–2014 
Her album Unwanted Thoughts Syndrome, produced by Comedy Central Records, was released in April 2009 and includes a DVD containing The Maria Bamford Show episodes. During the Christmas 2009-2010 shopping seasons, she was featured in a series of Target commercials, portraying an overachieving shopper determined to be first in line. For Christmas 2009, she released a free stand-up special online as a gift to her fans.

While working in voice-over shows and advertisements in Los Angeles, she was hospitalized three times over the course of 18 months for nervous breakdowns. She commented on the hospital visits by saying "it was the responsible thing to do" after she felt "suicidal" and "dispirited".

In 2012 she released The Special Special Special for download through Chill.com. The special was recorded at her own home in Los Angeles with only her parents present as the audience.

In 2013, she created and starred in a web series called Ask My Mom. She plays both herself and her mother, who answers questions sent in by fans. Also in 2013, she appeared as herself in one episode of the interview web series All Growz Up with Melinda Hill. She voiced Pema in Nickelodeon cartoon The Legend of Korra.

In 2013, she appeared in season four of Arrested Development as Debrie Bardeaux, Tobias Fünke's love interest. The series creator noted her as a comical "genius" and said that "real artists [like Maria] talk about things that nobody else talks about, and talk about them candidly." She remained on the series until it concluded in 2019.

Lady Dynamite and critical acclaim: 2014–present 

She appeared in Season 3 of Louis C.K.'s Louie. In 2014, she co-created, wrote, and starred in The Program with Melinda Hill, produced by Funny or Die. In 2014, she won the American Comedy Award for Best Club Comic. In January 2016, she was a guest on The Late Show with Stephen Colbert, where host Stephen Colbert called her his "favorite comedian on planet Earth".

In early 2016, Netflix announced an original series based on her life, called Lady Dynamite, starring her, released in May 2016. She was invited to the writing process. She did not write any episodes, but was often in the writers' room, discussing ideas and "hanging out". The writers had freedom to modify her experiences for creative purposes.

In May 2017, she was the commencement speaker for the University of Minnesota's College of Liberal Arts. During the speech, she gave a check made out to Sallie Mae for $5,000, her net speaking fee, to a graduate in the audience who had student loans.

In April 2018, she appeared on season 13 of Worst Cooks in America. She was eliminated in the fourth episode.

Comedy style 

Bamford's unique comedic style has drawn praise and criticism. She is best known for her portrayal of her dysfunctional family and self-deprecating comedy involving jokes about depression and anxiety. Her comedy style is surreal and incorporates voice impressions of various character types. Zach Freeman of the Chicago Tribune has noted her content and comedic style as "comically erratic" with "seemingly unrelated tangents and constantly varying vocal inflections". David Sims of The Atlantic noted her roles and voice work as having themes of "serial passivity" stemming from her "polite upbringing and own internal anxieties". Film producer Judd Apatow has described her comedic style as "complex" and "bizarre", later calling her "the funniest woman in the world". Variety described Bamford's performance in Lady Dynamite, saying that "the actress and comedian, whose presence has rarely been used as well as it is here, manages the neat trick of being both believably guileless and winningly sharp." A 2014 New York Times profile of Bamford noted her comedic style by saying: Much of Bamford's work examines the relationship between "people" — generally well-intentioned friends and family — and those who grapple with depression or anxiety or any other challenge to the psyche. Her act is a series of monologues and mini skits performed rapid fire and often without regard for transition. Deploying a range of deadpan voices, she mimics the faux enlightened who hover around the afflicted, offering toothless platitudes, bootstrapping pep talks, or concern warped by self-interest. The humor of any given moment relies not so much on punch lines as it does on the impeccably timed swerves of her tone, the interplay between Bamford's persona and those of all the people who don't get her.

Personal life
Bamford stated in an interview with The Salt Lake Tribune that she has been diagnosed with bipolar II disorder, and obsessive–compulsive disorder (OCD). In stand-up, she describes bipolar as "the new gladiator sandal".

On December 11, 2014, during her show at the Neptune Theater in Seattle, she announced that she was engaged to artist Scott Marvel Cassidy. They were married at a private ceremony in 2015. She has one sister, Sarah Seidelmann, who is a life coach and shaman. She has a private residence in Los Angeles, California, and a home in Altadena, California. She loves pugs, and typically owns at least one senior pug at any given time.

Filmography

Film

Television

Web series

Discography 
 The Burning Bridges Tour (2003) [CD]
 How to WIN! (2007) [CD]
 Unwanted Thoughts Syndrome (2009) [CD]
 Plan B (2010) [DVD]
 The Special Special Special! (2012) [video download]
 Ask Me About My New God! (2013) [CD]
 20% (2016) [CD]
 Maria Bamford: Old Baby (2017) [Netflix]
 Weakness Is the Brand (2020) [album/video]

Podcasts
 Bonanas for Bonanza (2020)

References

Further reading

External links

 
 
 Maria Bamford at Comedy Central
 Radio interview with Bamford on NPR's Fresh Air (38 min., 2013)

1970 births
Living people
Actresses from California
Actresses from Duluth, Minnesota
American film actresses
American stand-up comedians
American television actresses
American television writers
American voice actresses
American women comedians
American women television writers
Comedians from California
Comedians from Minnesota
People from Greater Los Angeles
People with bipolar disorder
People with obsessive–compulsive disorder
People from Port Hueneme, California
Screenwriters from California
Screenwriters from Minnesota
Stand Up! Records artists
University of Minnesota College of Liberal Arts alumni
20th-century American actresses
21st-century American actresses
20th-century American comedians
21st-century American comedians